= Germaine Huot =

Canadian speech–language pathologist (1919–2017)

Germaine Huot CM CQ
- Born: November 1919; Montreal, Quebec, Canada
- Died: June 2017 (aged 97)
- Occupation: Speech–language pathologist
- Known for: Co-founding the first master's program in speech–language pathology at the Université de Montréal
- Awards: Knight of the National Order of Quebec (2000); Order of Canada (2001)

Germaine Huot CM CQ, was a Quebec speech therapist born in Montreal in 1919 and passed away in 2017.

She contributed to the creation of the first master's degree programme in speech therapy at the University of Montreal in 1956. In 1986 the Ordre des orthophonistes et audiologistes du Québec established the Germaine Huot Award to recognize excellence in professional achievement in the field.

== Honours ==
- 2000 Knight of the National Order of Quebec
- 2001 Member of the Order of Canada.
